"A Thousand Years" is a song recorded by American singer and songwriter Christina Perri, and written by Perri and David Hodges, for The Twilight Saga: Breaking Dawn – Part 1. The song was released as a digital download on October 18, 2011, worldwide, and serves as the second single for the movie. Perri re-recorded the song with vocals from Steve Kazee for The Twilight Saga: Breaking Dawn – Part 2.

Composition 
"A Thousand Years" is in the key of B-flat major, with a vocal range of F3 to C5.

The song was written about the love affair between Edward and Bella in the novel and subsequent film series Twilight.

Music video
An official lyric video of the song was premiered on October 17, 2011, via Perri's official Facebook and Twitter pages as well as her official website. On October 26, 2011, she released an official video for the song on her YouTube channel. The video begins with Perri holding a candle. It features a few clips from The Twilight Saga: Breaking Dawn – Part 1 interspersed between scenes with Perri singing in a room with a floor full of candles. Perri ends the video singing into a sunset.

It has over 2 billion views, making it one of the top 100 most-viewed YouTube videos.

Cover versions 

 A cover by American crossover band The Piano Guys was uploaded on YouTube on May 9, 2012; as of November 2022, it has over 209 million views.
 American band Boyce Avenue released an acoustic version of "A Thousand Years". It has over 130 million views as of May 2021.
 In March 2018, mothers of children with Down syndrome in the United Kingdom produced a video cover of the song for World Down Syndrome Day that went viral. Christina Perri declared her support for the idea and waived any copyright claim to the music in support of the campaign. As of May 2021, the video has over 8 million views.
 American band New Found Glory also covered it on their cover compilation album From The Screens To Your Stereo Vol. 3.

Chart performance
On the week of October 23, 2011, the song debuted at number 63 on the US Billboard Hot 100 chart, and number 70 on Canadian Hot 100. It eventually reached a peak at number 31 on the Billboard Hot 100, giving Perri her second top 40 hit. By July 2013, the song has sold over three million digital downloads in the US.  As of June 2014, the song has sold 3,657,000 copies in the US. On March 3, 2022, the single was certified diamond by the Recording Industry Association of America (RIAA) for selling ten million units in the United States.

In the United Kingdom, the song reached number 32 on its original release in 2011. The following year, after the release of The Twilight Saga: Breaking Dawn – Part 2, it peaked at number 13. In 2013, it reached a new peak of 11.

Charts

Weekly charts

"A Thousand Years"

"A Thousand Years, Pt. 2"

Year-end charts

Decade-end charts

Certifications

"A Thousand Years"

"A Thousand Years, Pt. 2"

Release history

References

External links

2011 singles
2010s ballads
Christina Perri songs
Pop ballads
Atlantic Records singles
Songs written by David Hodges
2011 songs
Songs written by Christina Perri